The Luzon lambanog deaths started to occur in late November 2018 in separate places in the Philippines after drinking arrack (locally known in the Philippines as lambanog) in separate places in the Philippines.

Poisoning 
The case started on November 29 when the residents from Calamba, Laguna drank the lambanog (locally known for arrack) and begin to symptoms such as stomach cramps, resulting in bringing them to the hospital; they subsequently died thereafter. Person who consumed lambanog experienced other symptoms such as nausea, chest pains, and blurry vision. Meanwhile, another four person, who were tricycle drivers, were reported to have died after they consumed arrack and thirteen others were hospitalized in Quezon City.

References 

November 2018 events in the Philippines